The Streets of San Francisco is the second full-length album by Californian punk rock band Swingin' Utters, released in 1995. It was produced by Lars Frederiksen of Rancid. All songs were newly recorded for the album, although several had been on the band's previous releases.

The original LP was issued by New Red Archives and released on at least four different colors of vinyl: orange, yellow, purple and blue.

Track listing
All songs written by Darius Koski, except where noted.
"Storybook Disease" - 2:22
"Jackie Jab" (Johnny Bonnel/Koski/Kevin Wickersham) - 1:44
"Tied Down, Spit On" - 1:19
"Teenage Genocide" (Koski/Wickersham) - 1:39
"Catastrophe" - 4:53
"Mr. Believer" - 2:23
"Well Wisher" - 1:22
"No Place in the Sun" (Bonnel/Koski)- 2:29
"(A) Petty Wage" - 1:59
"Come On!" (Joel Dison) - 1:34
"No Eager Men" - 2:46
"(A) Beached Sailor" - 2:08
"(Take Me to the) Riverbank" - 2:29
"Just Like Them" (Bonnel/Koski) - 1:47
"Stars and Starlets" (Bonnel/Koski) - 1:15
"Soldier Boy" - 2:17
"Last Chance" - 1:51
"All Laced Up (But Pitfallen)" (Bonnel/Dison/Koski) - 2:45
"Expletive Deleted" - 3:06

Personnel
Johnny Peebucks: lead vocals
Darius Koski: guitar, vocals, accordion on tracks #4, 12, 17
Max Huber: guitar
Greg McEntee: drums
Kevin Wickersham: bass guitar

External links
Swingin' Utters official discography
[ "The Streets of San Francisco" on Allmusic]

Swingin' Utters albums
Fat Wreck Chords albums
1995 albums
New Red Archives albums